Elizabeth Bacon may refer to:

 Elizabeth Bacon (died 1621), English aristocrat
 Elizabeth D. Bacon (1844–1917), American suffragist
 Elizabeth Bacon Custer (1842–1933), American author and public speaker